Ángel Montoro Cabello (born 10 April 1989, in Toledo) is a Spanish handball player who plays for Olympiacos H.C.

Internationally he represents Spain, winning the 2013 World Championship.

Honours

Club
FC Barcelona
Liga ASOBAL: 2012-2013
Copa ASOBAL: 2012–13
Spanish Supercup: 2012–13

International
World Handball Championship: 2013
Mediterranean Games: bronze medal in 2018

References

External links

Spanish male handball players
Olympiacos H.C. players
FC Barcelona Handbol players
CB Ademar León players
Liga ASOBAL players
1989 births
Living people
Mediterranean Games bronze medalists for Spain
Mediterranean Games medalists in handball
Competitors at the 2018 Mediterranean Games